Toreulia is a genus of moths belonging to the family Tortricidae.

Species
Toreulia acanthina Razowski, Pelz & Wojtusiak, 2007
Toreulia basalis Razowski & Becker, 2000
Toreulia imminuta Razowski, Pelz & Wojtusiak, 2007
Toreulia nimia Razowski & Becker, 2000
Toreulia placita Razowski, Pelz & Wojtusiak, 2007
Toreulia runtunana Razowski, Pelz & Wojtusiak, 2007
Toreulia torrens Razowski & Becker, 2000

See also
List of Tortricidae genera

References

 , 2000: Description of three North Andean genera of Euliini and their seven species (Lepidoptera: Tortricidae). SHILAP Revista de Lepidopterologia. 28. 109–117.
 , 2007, Genus 18 (1): 107-115

External links
tortricidae.com

Euliini
Tortricidae genera